I See Red is the debut extended play by indie band Uh Huh Her.  I See Red was released on July 24. 2007, on Plaid Records.

Background
Leisha Hailey, having been absent from the music industry since the dissolution of her former band The Murmurs, ran into Camila Grey, who was a member of Mellowdrone, at a paintball game in 2006 and had decided to form a band.  Alicia Warrington had originally been the third member but left the group early on.

Two tracks on I See Red were later re-released on their debut album Common Reaction; "Say So", first recorded with Hailey as the lead vocalist and the only recording with Alicia Warrington, and "Explode".

Critical reception
In a mixed review, Popmatters states "...The bright and sunny electropop on their debut EP I See Red reminds of Kosheen, though it’s not as radio-single-ready...... single “Say So”, here in two versions, doesn’t show the group’s full potential, though: catchy enough for a TV theme or commercial, it’s lacking the irresistible hook of a chorus that would make the group a household name..."

Track listing
 "Explode" - 2:55
 "Run" - 4:12
 "I See Red" - 4:18
 "Say So"   3:24
 "Say So" (Thom Russo mix) -  3:46
 "Mystery Lights" (bonus track) - 4:15

References

2007 debut EPs
Uh Huh Her (band) albums